Al Downing (January 9, 1940 – July 4, 2005), later known as Big Al Downing, was an American musician, and entertainer. He received the Billboard's New Artist of the Year and the Single of the Year Award in 1979. He was inducted into the Rockabilly Hall of Fame and was a frequent performer at the Grand Ole Opry. Downing was nominated as Best New Artist by the Academy of Country Music and appeared on Hee Haw, Nashville Now, and Dick Clark's American Bandstand television programs.

Biography

Early career
He was born in Lenapah, Oklahoma, United States. Downing began his career doing piano and vocals in Bobby Poe and The Poe Kats, who were an early backing band for country entertainer Wanda Jackson. His piano contributed to the single "Let's Have A Party", which was released in 1960. The song reached No. 32 on the UK Singles Chart and made the Top 40 on the U.S. Billboard Hot 100.

Downing reached the U.S. Hot 100 with "You’ll Never Miss the Water (Till the Well Runs Dry)", a duet with Little Esther Phillips. After the release of this single, he was signed by Warner Brothers. In 1974, Downing recorded the single, "I'll Be Holding On", which went to number one on the U.S. Disco chart for three weeks. In addition, "I'll Be Holding On" was a hit in Europe.  On the other US charts, the single went to No. 31 on the soul chart and No. 85 on the Billboard Hot 100.

Country music with Warner Brothers
Al Downing's popularity continued to grow, and he had several hits on the country charts between 1978 and 1989. He compiled a list of his own songs, which he presented to his producer at Warner Brothers. In 1978, "Mr. Jones" reached the Top 20, followed by "Touch Me (I'll Be Your Fool Once More)" in 1979. That same year, Downing produced "Midnight Lace," which reached the 50s on the charts, and "I Ain't No Fool," which peaked at the upper 70s. In 1980, the "Story Behind The Story" reached the Top 40 and "Bring It On Home" reached the Top 20.

Two years passed before Downing created another hit, this time with the Team label. In 1982, "I'll Be Loving You" reached the Top 50, followed by "Darlene," which reached the lower 60s. The next year, "It Takes Love" reached the Top 40, followed by "Let's Sing About Love," which peaked in the mid-60s. In 1984, "The Best Of Families" became a Top 50 hit; That same year, Downing released his final hit with the Team label, "There’ll Never Be A Better Night For Being Wrong".

Vine Street years
In 1987, Downing was signed by the Vine Street label, which released the "Oh How Beautiful You Are" (To Me) and "Just One Night Won't Do," both of which hit the Top 70. Two years later, he was signed by Door Knob Records, with whom he produced the 1989 Top 100 hit, "I Guess By Now."

The popular entertainer Fats Domino recorded two songs written by Downing: "Mary, Oh Mary" and "Heartbreak Hill". Bobby "Blue" Bland and Tom Jones have also recorded Downing's songs.

Later career
Downing built a five-decade career around his powerful singing voice and his hard-driving rockabilly-style piano. Downing's compilations of earlier work have been released throughout the world. In Europe, Crazy Music obtained exclusive rights for the original Team label recordings and released these in the form of a 2-CD compilation, Classic Collection. This also contained some of Downing's earlier hits, including "Mr. Jones."

In July 2002, he played the Oneida Casino's Rock'n'Roll Festival in Green Bay, Wisconsin with dozens of other rockabilly musicians.

In 2003, Downing released his first new album in more than a decade, One of A Kind. The album received favourable radio and print reviews. It ranked third on American Roots Country and was commended for featuring 14 memorable tracks. He continued to give regular performances at the Grand Ole Opry. In 2000, he was nominated as a member of the Rockabilly Hall of Fame and the Oklahoma Music Hall of Fame.

Downing continued to perform on more than 75 occasions per year in the remaining years of his life. He appeared at Ontario's Havelock Country Jamboree with Kenny Rogers and Roy Clark. In 2005, Downing postponed plans for a European tour that was set to begin on July 1 in Austria. He was hospitalized and diagnosed with acute lymphoblastic leukemia. Soon after, he commenced chemotherapy treatment. Downing died on July 4, 2005.

Style
Downing's musical style found its roots in a variety of musical styles including rock and roll, blues, roots, gospel and country. He performed rhythm and blues and disco throughout the 1960s and 1970s, when he lived in Washington, D.C.  He eventually reclaimed his musical roots by turning to country music.

Producer 
In additional to his work as a recording artist and performer, Downing also worked as a music producer. During late 1990s and early 2000s, he worked with several European musicians as an artists and repertoire (A&R) agent. In 2003, he produced the album, Straight Beat, with the Italian bluesman Edo 'Ndoss, which included songs written by Downing that he had not recorded himself. Downing's piano work on this album represented his last recording.

Discography

Albums

Singles

See also
 List of number-one dance singles of 1974 (U.S.)
 List of number-one dance singles of 1975 (U.S.)

References

External links
Official Big Al Downing Homepage
Rockabilly Hall of Fame
[ All Music article]

1940 births
2005 deaths
Deaths from acute lymphocytic leukemia
African-American country musicians
20th-century African-American male singers
American male singer-songwriters
African-American pianists
American country singer-songwriters
American dance musicians
Carlton Records artists
Chess Records artists
Singer-songwriters from Oklahoma
People from Nowata County, Oklahoma
Deaths from cancer in Massachusetts
20th-century American singers
20th-century American pianists
American male pianists
Country musicians from Oklahoma
20th-century American male singers
African-American songwriters
21st-century African-American people